Jonas may refer to:

Geography
 Jonas, Netherlands, Netherlands
 Jonas, Pennsylvania, United States
 Jonas Ridge, North Carolina, United States

People with the name
 Jonas (name), people with the given name or surname Jonas
 Jonas, one of two  Jeneum (figures in the Book of Mormon)
 Jonah or Jonas, a prophet in the Hebrew Bible
 Jonas (footballer, born 1943), full name Jonas Bento de Carvalho, Brazilian football midfielder
 Jonas (footballer, born 1972), full name Carlos Emanuel Romeu Lima, Angolan football midfielder
 Jonas (footballer, born 1983), full name Jonas Brignoni dos Santos, Brazilian football defender
 Jonas (footballer, born 1984), full name Jonas Gonçalves Oliveira, Brazilian football forward
 Jonas (footballer, born 1987), full name Jonas Jessue da Silva Júnior, Brazilian football defender
 Jonas (footballer, born 1991), full name Jonas Gomes de Sousa, Brazilian football midfielder

Arts, entertainment, and media
 Jonas (novel), a 1955 novel by Jens Bjørneboe
 Jonas (TV series), a television series starring the Jonas Brothers
 Jonas, a character in The Giver by Lois Lowry
 Jonas, an oratorio by Italian composer Giacomo Carissimi
 I Am Jonas, a 2018 French film, original title Jonas
 Jonas, a character in Dark, a German television series produced by Netflix

Other uses
 JOnAS, an application server
 Storm Jonas, January 2016 United States winter storm
 Jonas (crustacean), a genus of crustaceans in the family Corystidae

See also
 Jonas Brothers, a band